This is the list of European youth records in Olympic weightlifting. They are the best results set in competition by athletes aged 13 to 17 throughout the entire calendar year of the performance. Records are maintained in each weight class for the snatch, clean and jerk, and the total for both by the European Weightlifting Federation (EWF).

Current records

Men

Women

Historical records

Men (1998–2018)

Women (1998–2018)

References

External links
EWF official website 
European Records – Youth Men
European Records – Youth Women

Youth,records,Olympic weightlifting
European, youth
Weightlifting youth